Accrington Cricket Club is a cricket club in the Lancashire League, which play their home games at Thorneyholme Road in Accrington. For the 2011 season their captain was Jimmy Hayhurst and their professional was Ashar Zaidi.

The club was formed in 1846  and became a founder member of the Lancashire League in 1892. The club has won the League on five occasions, fielding well known cricketers including David Lloyd, Graeme Fowler, Nathan Astle, Bobby Simpson, Eddie Barlow and Shane Warne. In the 21st century, however, the club has struggled and in 2007 it was revealed that the club had debts exceeding £10,000 and that its future was at risk. The club have struggled through these problems though and won the double in 2008 and retained the league title against the odds in 2009.

Honours
1st XI League Winners - 8 - 1914, 1915, 1916, 1961, 1975, 2008, 2009, 2013
Worsley Cup Winners - 4 - 1936, 1970, 1986, 2008
Ron Singleton Colne Trophy Winners - 2 - 2013, 2014
2nd XI League Winners - 1 - 1912
2nd XI (Lancashire Telegraph) Cup Winners - 3 - 1978, 1979, 2000
3rd XI League Winners - 1 - 2001
Highest 50 overs score - 341-5 v Rawtenstall, May 6, 2006

References

External links
Accrington CC at lancashireleague.com
Accrington Cricket Club Detailed History

Lancashire League cricket clubs
Sport in Hyndburn
Accrington
Cricket in Lancashire
1846 establishments in England